Governorate or provincial elections are due to be held in Dahuk Governorate in 2009 to replace the governorate council elected in the Iraqi governorate elections of 2005. The remaining governorates outside Iraqi Kurdistan held elections on 31 January 2009. The election will follow the 2009 Iraqi Kurdistan legislative election.

References 

2009 Iraqi governorate elections